The United Services College was an English boys' public school for the sons of military officers, located at Westward Ho! near Bideford in North Devon. Almost all boys were boarders. The school was founded to prepare pupils for a career as officers in the armed services, many of them going on to the Royal Military College, Sandhurst, or the Royal Naval College, Dartmouth.

History
The college was founded in 1874. Its first headmaster, Cormell Price, was a housemaster at Haileybury College and took twelve Haileybury boys with him to the new school.

USC suffered financial difficulties and closed in 1903. Its boys were ultimately absorbed by St Mark's School, Windsor in 1906. That was soon renamed as "Imperial Service College" and itself merged with Haileybury College in 1942.

As at virtually all boys' schools of its era, corporal punishment (strokes of the cane) was used, but USC was very unusual in that the cane was applied to the student's upper back (as described by Kipling) rather than the buttocks.

Notable former pupils

Rudyard Kipling (1865–1936), writer. His collection of stories, Stalky & Co, is based on his experiences at the College, which he joined in January 1878 and left in the summer of 1882. He dedicated the book to Cormell Price, headmaster of the school for its first twenty years, and Price is portrayed in it as someone the boys respected.
Major-General Lionel Dunsterville CB, CSI (1865–1946), a contemporary of Kipling, and the inspiration for the character of Stalky in the Stalky & Co. stories
George Charles Beresford (1864–1938), photographer, inspiration for "M'Turk" in Stalky & Co.
Bruce Bairnsfather (1887–1959), cartoonist and author
Colonel Edward Douglas Browne-Synge-Hutchinson, VC, CB (attended United Services College Day Boy 1875). He was a Major when he earned his VC.
Brigadier General George William St. George Grogan, VC, CB, CMG, DSO & Bar (attended 1890–1893)
Brigadier General The Honourable Alexander Gore Arkwright Hore-Ruthven, VC, GCMG, CB, DSO & Bar, PC, Croix de Guerre (France and Belgium). He was a Captain when he earned his VC.
Brigadier General Francis Aylmer Maxwell, VC, CSI, DSO & Bar, (attended 1883–1890)
Captain Anketell Moutray Read, VC, (attended 1898–1902)
Major General Cyril Wagstaff, Commandant of the Royal Military Academy, Woolwich.
Archibald Ritchie (1869–1955), British Army Major-General of World War I
Colonel Bernard Underwood Nicolay (attended 1887–1892)

References

External links
USC at the Westward Ho! History Group
USC at the Kipling Society

Educational institutions established in 1874
Defunct schools in Devon
Educational institutions disestablished in 1906
1874 establishments in England
1906 disestablishments in England